Shahid Major Pradeep Tathawade Udyan (or Major Tathawade Garden) is a public garden and a major landmark in Pune, Maharashtra, India. The garden was opened to the public on 31 October 2002 and is maintained by the Garden department of Pune Municipal Corporation.

About the Garden
The park is named after Major Pradeep Tathawade, who died fighting militants in the Poonch district of Jammu in June 2000. A life-size statue of Major Tathawade stands at the entrance to the garden.

The park is spread over 2.75 acres land and has a 260 metres long jogging track along the circumference. The park features several water fountains and a children's play park. At the centre of the park is an artificial pond with fish in it. Most prominently, a Pakistani tank that served in the Indo-Pak war is present in the garden. It was given to the Pune Municipal Corporation by the Indian Army.

The garden also has a lawn facing stage which is often used for public performances etc. Amenities including separate restrooms for men and women.

Business hours
The park is open to the public at following time of the day.
 6 am to 10 am
 4 pm to 6 pm

See also
 Pune Municipal Corporation
 Pune-Okayama Friendship Garden
 Kamala Nehru Park
 P L Deshpande Garden
 Peshwe Park
 Saras Baug
 Shunyo Park
 Rajiv Gandhi Zoological Park
 Baner-Pashan Biodiversity Park

References

External links
 Tathawade Udyan on Pune Municipal Corporation website

Parks in Pune
Gardens in India